The Western Institute of Technology (also referred to as WIT) is an engineering college in Iloilo City, Philippines. The college was organized in 1964 to establish an engineering school to serve the growing manpower needs of Western Visayas.

References

External links

Universities and colleges in Iloilo City